Busabout may refer to:

Busabout Sydney - bus operator in Sydney, Australia
Busabout Wagga Wagga - bus operator in Wagga Wagga, Australia
Busabout, a European travel operator owned by The Travel Corporation